B Album is the second studio album of the Japanese duo KinKi Kids. It was released on August 12, 1998 and debuted at the top of the Oricon charts, selling 524,540 copies in its first week. The album was certified Million by RIAJ.

Track listing

References

 B Album. Johnny's net. Retrieved October 31, 2009.

External links
 Official KinKi Kids website

1998 albums
KinKi Kids albums